Cochrane  is an unincorporated community in Pickens County, Alabama, United States.

History
Cochrane is named for John T. Cochrane, the founder of Aliceville, Alabama. Cochrane served as the superintendent of the Tuscaloosa Belt Line, which was part of the Alabama, Tennessee and Northern Railroad. A post office operated under the name Cochrane from 1907 to 1972.

The John T. Milner Bridge, located in Cochrane, was the first toll bridge in Alabama to be officially dedicated.

References

Unincorporated communities in Pickens County, Alabama
Unincorporated communities in Alabama